This is a list of avant-garde and experimental films released in the 2000s.

References 

2000s
Avant-garde